The 1983 Volvo Grand Prix was a professional tennis circuit held that year. It incorporated the four grand slam tournaments, the Grand Prix tournaments, and two team tournaments (the Davis Cup and the World Team Cup. The circuit was administered by the Men's International Professional Tennis Council (MIPTC).

Schedule
The table below shows the 1983 Volvo Grand Prix schedule (a precursor to the ATP Tour).

January

February

March

April

May

June

July

August

September

October

November

December

January 1984

ATP rankings

*The official ATP year-end rankings were listed from January 2nd, 1984.

List of tournament winners
The list of winners and number of Grand Prix titles won, alphabetically by last name:
 John Alexander (1) Auckland
 Roberto Argüello (1) Venice
 Pablo Arraya (1) Bordeaux
 Jimmy Arias (4) Florence, Rome, Indianapolis, Palermo
 Mike Bauer (1) Adelaide
 Pat Cash (1) Brisbane,
 José Luis Clerc (4) Guarujá, Boston, Washington, D.C., North Conway
 Jimmy Connors (4) Memphis, Las Vegas, Queen's Club, US Open
 Marty Davis (1) Cleveland
 Scott Davis (1) Maui
 Brad Drewett (1) South Orange
 Matt Doyle (1) Cologne
 John Fitzgerald (2) Newport, Stowe
 Vitas Gerulaitis (1) Basel
 Sammy Giammalva (1) Monterrey
 Andrés Gómez (1) Dallas
 Brian Gottfried (1) Vienna
 Heinz Günthardt (1) Toulouse
 José Higueras (3) La Quinta, Bournemouth, Stuttgart Outdoor
 Thomas Högstedt (1) Ferrara
 Aaron Krickstein (1) Tel Aviv
 Johan Kriek (3) Tampa, Bristol, Johannesburg
 Ivan Lendl (8) Masters, Detroit WCT, Milan, Houston WCT, Hilton Head WCT, Montreal, San Francisco, Tokyo Indoor
 Wally Masur (1) Hong Kong
 Gene Mayer (2) Rotterdam, Los Angeles
 Sandy Mayer (1) Gstaad
 John McEnroe (6) Philadelphia, Dallas WCT, Wimbledon, Forest Hills WCT, Sydney Indoor, Wembley
 Peter McNamara (1) Brussels
 Yannick Noah (3) Madrid, Hamburg, French Open
 Joakim Nyström (1) Sydney Outdoor
 Nduka Odizor (1) Taiwan
 Víctor Pecci (1) Viña del Mar
 Raúl Ramírez (1) Caracas
 Pedro Rebolledo (1) Bahia
 Nick Saviano (1) Nancy
 Tomáš Šmíd (2) Munich, Hilversum
 Henrik Sundström (1) Nice
 Brian Teacher (2) Munich WCT, Columbus
 Eliot Teltscher (1) Tokyo Outdoor
 Guillermo Vilas (3) Richmond WCT, Delray Beach WCT, Kitzbüjel
 Mats Wilander (9) Monte Carlo, Lisbon, Aix-en-Provence, Båstad, Cincinnati, Geneva, Barcelona, Stockholm, Australian Open

The following players won their first title in 1983:
 Roberto Argüello Venice
 Pablo Arraya Bordeaux
 Marty Davis Cleveland
 Scott Davis Maui
 Matt Doyle Cologne
 Thomas Högstedt Ferrara
 Aaron Krickstein Tel Aviv
 Wally Masur Hong Kong
 Joakim Nyström Sydney Outdoor
 Nduka Odizor Taiwan
 Nick Saviano Nancy
 Henrik Sundström Nice

See also
 1983 World Championship Tennis circuit
 1983 Virginia Slims World Championship Series

Further reading

Notes

References

External links
ATP Archive 1983: Volvo Grand Prix Tournaments
History Mens Professional Tours

 
Grand Prix tennis circuit seasons
Grand Prix